A Pilot Returns (Italian: Un pilota ritorna) is a 1942 Italian war film directed by Roberto Rossellini and starring Massimo Girotti, Michela Belmonte and Piero Lulli. The film forms part of Rossellini's "Fascist trilogy" along with The White Ship (1941) and The Man with a Cross (1943). It was made with the co-operation of the Italian Air Force. The film's sets were designed by the architect Virgilio Marchi.

Synopsis 
During the 1940-1941 Italian invasion of Greece, an Italian pilot is shot down and captured by British forces who place him in a prisoner-of-war camp. While there he meets and falls in love with a young Italian woman who has volunteered to care for the prisoners. After escaping from the British, he manages to steal a plane and return to Italy for further duty. On his arrival he learns that Greece has been successfully conquered by the Axis Powers.

Cast 
 Massimo Girotti as Gino Rossati 
 Michela Belmonte as Anna 
 Piero Lulli as De Santis 
 Gaetano Masier as Trisotti 
 Elvira Betrone as Signora Rossati 
 Piero Palermini as English Official
 Giovanni Valdambrini as medico 
 Nino Brondello as Vitali 
 Jole Tinta as madre

References

Bibliography
 Bondanella, Peter. The Films of Roberto Rossellini. Cambridge University Press, 1993.
 Haaland, Torunn. Italian Neorealist Cinema. Edinburgh University Press, 2012.

External links

1942 films
Italian war drama films
Italian black-and-white films
1942 drama films
1940s war drama films
1940s Italian-language films
Films directed by Roberto Rossellini
Italian aviation films
World War II films made in wartime
Films set in Greece
Greco-Italian War
Films scored by Renzo Rossellini
Italian World War II films
1940s Italian films